Susan Oliver (born Charlotte Gercke, February 13, 1932 – May 10, 1990) was an American actress, television director, and aviator.

Early life and family
 
Oliver was the daughter of George Gercke, a journalist, and Ruth Hale Oliver, an astrology practitioner, in New York City in 1932. Her father was a political reporter and journalist for the New York World. Her parents divorced when she was still a child. In June 1949, Oliver joined her mother in Southern California, where Ruth was in the process of becoming a well-known Hollywood astrologer. Oliver made a decision to embark upon a career as an actress and chose the stage name Susan Oliver, using her mother's maiden name.

Career

Early years
By September 1949 and using her new name, Oliver returned to the East Coast to begin drama studies at Swarthmore College, followed by professional training at the Neighborhood Playhouse School of the Theatre in New York City. After working in summer stock and regional theater, and in unbilled bits in daytime and primetime television shows and commercials, she made her first major television appearance in a supporting role in the July 31, 1955, episode of the live drama series Goodyear TV Playhouse, and quickly progressed to leading parts in other shows.

Oliver did numerous television shows in 1957, and appeared on stage. She began the year with an ingénue part, as the daughter of an 18th-century Manhattan family, in her first Broadway play, Small War on Murray Hill, a Robert E. Sherwood comedy. That same year, Oliver replaced Mary Ure as the female lead in the Broadway production of John Osborne's play Look Back in Anger.

The play's short run was immediately followed by larger roles in live television plays on Kaiser Aluminum Hour, The United States Steel Hour, and Matinee Theater. Oliver then went to Hollywood, where she appeared in the November 14, 1957, episode of Climax!, one of the few live drama series based on the West Coast, as well as in a number of filmed shows, including one of the first episodes of NBC's Wagon Train, Father Knows Best, The Americans, and Johnny Staccato.

In July 1957, Oliver was chosen for the title role in her first motion picture, The Green-Eyed Blonde, a low-budget independent melodrama scripted by Dalton Trumbo (under a pseudonym), and released by Warner Bros. in December on the bottom half of a double bill.

In mid-1958, Oliver began rehearsals for a co-starring role in Patate, her second Broadway play. Its seven-performance run was even shorter than that of Small War on Murray Hill, but won Oliver a Theatre World Award for "Outstanding Breakout Performance"; it was her last Broadway appearance.

Television and films

On April 6, 1960, the 28-year-old Oliver played a spoiled young runaway, Maggie Hamilton, who gets soundly spanked by scout Flint McCullough (Robert Horton), in "The Maggie Hamilton Story" on NBC's Wagon Train.  On November 9, 1960, she was cast as the lead guest star in "The Cathy Eckhart Story" on Wagon Train, with husband-and-wife actors John Larch and Vivi Janiss as Ben and Sarah Harness.

Oliver was cast in the 1960 episode of The Deputy as the long-lost daughter of star Henry Fonda's late girl friend, and appeared in Dick Powell's Zane Grey Theatre episode "Knife of Hate" as Susan Pittman. In 1961, Oliver played the part of Laurie Evans in the episode "Incident of His Brother's Keeper" on CBS's Rawhide, and in 1963, she played Judy Hall in the episode "Incident at Spider Rock", Also in 1962, Oliver appeared as Jeanie in the television series Laramie in the episode "Shadows in the Dust".

Oliver was cast in episodes of Adventures in Paradise, Twilight Zone, Route 66, Dr. Kildare, The Naked City, The Barbara Stanwyck Show, Burke's Law, The Fugitive, Gomer Pyle, U.S.M.C., I Spy, The Virginian, The Name of the Game, Longstreet, and Mannix. She made one appearance on The Andy Griffith Show and ABC's family Western series, The Travels of Jaimie McPheeters. She also made two appearances in Quinn Martin's The Invaders (episodes: "Inquisition" and "The Ivy Curtain") on ABC.

Her most challenging role during this time was as the ambitious wife of doomed country music legend Hank Williams (George Hamilton) in Your Cheatin' Heart (1964). The same year, she also starred opposite Jerry Lewis in The Disorderly Orderly, and appeared in The Man from U.N.C.L.E. (1965) and The Love-Ins (1967) with Richard Todd.

Oliver appeared in television films, including Carter's Army. She had a continuing role as Ann Howard on ABC's primetime serial Peyton Place in 1966.

Oliver played the female lead guest character Vina in "The Cage" (1964), which was the first pilot of Gene Roddenberry's new show, Star Trek. Two years later, Oliver's performance was reused in the first season, two-part episode "The Menagerie" (1966). Because the special optical effects used by the series were taking longer to complete than anticipated (which made a missed air date a real possibility), that pilot story was re-framed using newly filmed "current" footage and a time difference to explain the significant format and cast evolution since Oliver's scenes were filmed. In particular, Jeffrey Hunter played "Captain Christopher Pike" in the pilot episode, but was replaced by William Shatner as "Captain James T. Kirk" of the Starship Enterprise when the series was green-lit by NBC in 1966. For the fantasy sequence in the pilot, in which her character appeared as an "Orion slave girl", Oliver was covered in green makeup all over her body, and a dark brunette wig. A still of her with green skin is frequently seen in the end credits of the television series, and it has since become an iconic image of Star Trek. Hence, the 2014 documentary about Susan Oliver's life was titled The Green Girl.

In 1970, she appeared as Carole Carson/Alice Barnes on the television Western The Men From Shiloh (rebranded name for The Virginian) in the episode titled "Hannah".

From 1975 to 1976, Oliver was a regular cast member of the television soap opera Days of Our Lives. In 1976, she received her only Emmy Award nomination (for "Outstanding Performance by a Supporting Actress") in the three-hour-long, made-for-TV movie Amelia Earhart, broadcast on October 15, 1976, on NBC-TV.

In addition to her scores of television appearances, Oliver also had roles in several theatrical features, including The Gene Krupa Story (1959), BUtterfield 8 (1960) and The Caretakers (1963).

Directing and later years
By the late 1970s with acting opportunities coming less frequently, Oliver turned to directing. She was one of the original 19 women admitted to the American Film Institute's Directing Workshop for Women (DWW), and she left a "good chunk of funding for the DWW." In 1977, she wrote and directed Cowboysan, her AFI DWW short film that presents the fantasy scenario of a Japanese actor and actress playing leads in an American Western. Oliver directed two television episodes, the premiere episode "Hey, Look Me Over" of the 11th season of M*A*S*H and the season-five episode "Fat Chance" of one of M*A*S*H'''s sequel series, Trapper John, M.D.In Oliver's last fully active years, she also appeared in the February 21, 1985, episode of Magnum, P.I., two episodes of Murder, She Wrote (March 31 and December 1), the February 12, 1987, episode of Simon & Simon, and the January 10, 1988, episode of the NBC domestic drama Our House. She made her last onscreen appearance in the November 6, 1988, episode of the syndicated horror anthology Freddy's Nightmares. During her career in Hollywood, Oliver amassed 58 credits on various television programs.

Aviator and author
Oliver experienced an event in February 1959 that underscored her later aviation accomplishments. It was February 3, 1959, the same day Buddy Holly died in an airplane crash. These events caused her to avoid flying for the next year, even turning down job offers, with the exception of auditioning for BUtterfield 8, if they were so short notice that she could only travel by air. She eventually underwent hypnosis to overcome her fear of flying.

In July 1964, local Los Angeles area news anchor Hal Fishman introduced her to personal flying when he took her on an evening flight over Los Angeles in a Cessna 172. The experience motivated her to return the next day to the Santa Monica Airport to begin training for a private pilot certificate. In 1966, while preparing for her own transatlantic flight, she was a passenger in a Piper J-3 Cub when the pilot ran into wires while "show-boating"; the airplane flipped and crashed. She and the pilot escaped injury.

In 1967, piloting her own Aero Commander 200, she became the fourth woman to fly a single-engined aircraft solo across the Atlantic Ocean and the second to do it from New York City. Although she was attempting to fly to Moscow, her odyssey ended in Denmark after the government of the Soviet Union denied her permission to enter its air space. She wrote about her aviation exploits and philosophy of life in an autobiography published in 1983.

In 1968, she was contacted by Learjet to see if she was interested in obtaining a type rating on one of their jet planes with the intent to set record flights for them. She earned the rating and even flew some charters (having by that time acquired a commercial pilot certificate in single- and multiengined land airplanes), but did not fly any record flights in their jets.

In 1970, Oliver co-piloted a Piper Comanche to victory in the 2760-mile transcontinental race known as the "Powder Puff Derby", which resulted in her being named Pilot of the Year by the Association of Executive Pilots. The pilot was Margaret Mead (not the famous anthropologist), an experienced pilot who had flown in several derbies with different co-pilots. In 1971, Oliver was inducted as a member of the Federal Aviation Administration's Women Advisory Committee on Aviation.

In 1972, her training for a glider rating was chronicled for an episode of the television series The American Sportsman, and the segment aired in March 1973.

According to the FAA Registry, the glider rating was issued to Oliver on July 21, 1972. It was her last rating. The registry shows her to have earned commercial pilot ratings for airplane single-engined land, airplane multiengined land, instrument airplane, and private privileges for glider. Her last aviation medical examination was in May 1976, so she could not legally pilot any aircraft except gliders after May 1978, marking the end of her piloting of powered aircraft.

Death
Oliver was diagnosed with colorectal cancer that later metastasized to her lungs, and she died on May 10, 1990 (aged 58), at the Motion Picture and Television Hospital in Woodland Hills, California.

Selected filmography

Documentary
 The Green Girl (2014), biographical documentary film directed by George Pappy.

See also
 Manumit School

Further reading
 
 10. NTSB Identification: LAX67D0086

References

External links
 
 
 
 
 
 Listen to Susan Oliver on Zero Hour'' hosted by Rod Serling Zero Hour Podcast 1973-12-24 (ep51) John Dehner and Susan Oliver – Fourth of Forever – Part 1, with a new introduction.
 Los Angeles Times obituary

1932 births
1990 deaths
Actresses from New York City
American film actresses
American stage actresses
American television actresses
American television directors
American women television directors
Deaths from cancer in California
20th-century American actresses
American women commercial aviators
Aviators from New York (state)
Aviators from California